The 1999 Campeonato Nacional was Chilean first tier's 67th season which Universidad de Chile reached its tenth professional title. The relegated teams were Rangers, Deportes La Serena, Deportes Iquique and Cobresal. The tournament was played in two stages, the 8 first places qualified to the Championship Stage, where they carry over their points from the previous stage, but divided by four. For the Relegation Stage the complete points were carried over.

First stage

Relegation stage

Championship stage

Topscorers

Promotion/relegation play-offs

References

External links
 RSSSF Chile 1999

Primera División de Chile seasons
1
Chile